Kalamunda Eastern Suns is an NBL1 West club based in Perth, Western Australia. The club fields a team in both the Men's and Women's NBL1 West. The club is a division of Kalamunda & Districts Basketball Association (KDBA), the major administrative basketball organisation in Perth's eastern region. The Suns play their home games at Ray Owen Sports Centre.

Club history

Background
Kalamunda & Districts Basketball Association (KDBA) was incorporated on 1 October 1971. In 1991, after a period of non affiliation with Basketball Western Australia, KDBA entered teams as the Kalamunda Hornets in the WA Junior State League competition. After a decade of little success for KDBA, Basketball Western Australia encouraged the amalgamation of KDBA and their regional rival Swan Districts Basketball Association (SDBA). For a number of years, Kalamunda and Swans both entered about 9–12 of the 14 available divisions—Basketball WA sought to fill all divisions. This led to Hills Raiders Basketball Association (HRBA) seeking an opportunity for their players to access this level of competition. As a result, a new association called Eastern Region Basketball Association (ERBA), playing as Eastern Suns, was formed in 2001. The ERBA's inaugural president was Bob Little (HRBA President & SDBA Life Member) and all three associations had two representatives with ERBA. Initially there was input from all three associations, but this deteriorated when Swans (SDBA) found themselves in financial difficulty with increasing debt to Basketball WA. KDBA was in a position to seek a license from the State Basketball League (SBL) but was unwilling to assume the SDBA debt as part of their license (in excess of $40,000). Swan City Mustangs SBL and Association ceased to operate following the 2003 season.

In 2005, Basketball WA indicated that they would not be happy with the Eastern Suns (ERBA) having SDBA as part of the structure at either WABL or SBL level. They were only prepared to support an affiliated Association as the governing body of the WABL program. There were a series of meetings where SDBA maintained they still existed and HRBA sought to have representative involvement. Subsequently, HRBA declined to remain involved, and on 12 January 2006, ERBA was formally disbanded. In March 2006, the KDBA introduced their representative arm as the Kalamunda Eastern Suns. A formal approach to join the SBL was made and initial indications were that 2007 would be possible. Subsequently, Basketball WA made a statement in March 2007 claiming that Kalamunda could enter the SBL with both Men's and Women's teams in 2008.

SBL / NBL1 West
In 2008, Kalamunda & Districts Basketball Association (KDBA) secured a Men's and Women's SBL license. The inaugural men's coach was Joe Mackay, while Craig Mansfield and Rob Butt coached the women's team. While the men's team finished in ninth place with a 12–14 record, the women's earned a finals berth with a sixth-place finish and a 13–11 record. They went on to sweep the third-seeded Cockburn Cougars in the quarter-finals, before losing to the Perry Lakes Hawks in the semi-finals.

In 2013, the women's team made their way through to their first WSBL Grand Final behind coach Craig Mansfield and captain Chelsea Armstrong, as well as Ajay Jones, Jennie Rintala and Melissa Moyle. They finished the regular season in fifth place with a 12–10 record and advanced through the first two rounds of the finals undefeated, beating the Lakeside Lightning in the quarter-finals and the South West Slammers in the semi-finals. In the championship decider at the WA Basketball Centre on 30 August, the Suns were defeated 72–47 by the Wanneroo Wolves. Rintala top-scored for Kalamunda finishing with 11 points, seven rebounds and four blocked shots. Between 2008 and 2015, the women's team only missed the finals once.

In 2021, the SBL was rebranded as NBL1 West.

Accolades
Women
Championships: Nil
Grand Final appearances: 1 (2013)
Minor premierships: Nil

Men
Championships: Nil
Grand Final appearances: Nil
Minor premierships: Nil

References

External links
 KDBA's official website

Basketball teams in Western Australia
NBL1 West teams
Basketball teams established in 2008
2008 establishments in Australia